Ronald Joseph Hornsby (born August 16, 1949) is a former American football linebacker in the National Football League who played for the New York Giants. He played college football for the Southeastern Louisiana Lions.

He was traded to the Green Bay Packers in 1975 but never played for them.

References

1949 births
Living people
American football linebackers
New York Giants players
Southeastern Louisiana Lions football players